Silas Betton  (August 26, 1768 – January 22, 1822) was an American lawyer, sheriff and politician from the U.S. state of New Hampshire. He served as a member of the United States House of Representatives, the New Hampshire Senate and the New Hampshire House of Representatives during the late 1700s and early 1800s.

Early life
Betton was born in Londonderry in the Province of New Hampshire, the son of James and Elizabeth (Dickey) Betton. He studied under a private tutor, and graduated from Dartmouth College in 1787. He studied law, was admitted to the bar and began the practice of law in Salem, New Hampshire in 1790.

Political career
He was a member of the New Hampshire House of Representatives from 1797–1799 and a member of the New Hampshire Senate from 1801–1803. Elected as a Federalist candidate to the Eighth and Ninth Congresses, he served as a United States Representative for New Hampshire from March 4, 1803 to March 3, 1807. After leaving Congress, he resumed the practice of law. He served again as a member of the New Hampshire House of Representatives in 1810 and 1811.

When Josiah Butler left the office of sheriff of Rockingham County, Betton became high sheriff, serving from 1813–1818.

Death
Betton died in Salem, New Hampshire in 1822 and was interred at the Old Parish Cemetery in Salem.

Personal life
He married Mary Thornton Betton, the daughter of Matthew Thornton, a signer of the United States Declaration of Independence. They had seven children: Caroline Betton, George O. Betton, Harriet Betton, Mary J. Betton, Wealthy J. Betton, Thornton Betton and Charles Cotesworth Betton.

References

External links

1768 births
1822 deaths
People from Londonderry, New Hampshire
People from Salem, New Hampshire
Members of the New Hampshire House of Representatives
New Hampshire state senators
Dartmouth College alumni
New Hampshire sheriffs
Federalist Party members of the United States House of Representatives from New Hampshire